Kessleria macedonica is a moth of the family Yponomeutidae. It is found in North Macedonia.

The length of the forewings is about 8 mm. The forewings are light greyish brown. The hindwings are greyish brown. Adults have been recorded in July.

References

Moths described in 1992
Yponomeutidae